Glass Babies is a 1985 Australian television mini series about a ruthless family set in the world of the then-new technology of in-vitro fertilization.

Cast

 Rowena Wallace - Dr. Gloria McCrae
 Gary Day - Brendan Keller
 Deborra-Lee Furness - Joan Simpson
 Asher Keddie - Anna Simpson
 George Mikell - John Craig
 Belinda Davey - Sally Craig
 Andrew Sharp - Michael Craig

Home media

References

External links
Glass Babies at IMDb

English-language television shows
1980s Australian television miniseries
1985 Australian television series debuts
1985 Australian television series endings
1985 television films
1985 films